Mimi or MIMI may refer to:

People
 Mimi (given name), a list of people and fictional characters
 Constantin Mimi (1868–1935), Bessarabian politician and winemaker
 Mimi (footballer, born 1996), Bissau Guinean footballer
 Mohanad Ali (born 2000), Iraqi footballer commonly known as Mimi
 Mariah Carey (born 1969), with the personal nickname "Mimi" used in some of her albums
 Mimí (born 1962), Mexican singer
 Mimi Mariani (1928–1971), Indonesian actress, model, and singer

Places
 Mimi, Nepal, a village and municipality
 Mimi, New Zealand, a locality in Taranaki, New Zealand
 Mimi River (disambiguation)
 Mimi Islet, part of the Bourke Isles between Australia and New Guinea
 Mimi Temple, a temple in China
 1127 Mimi, an asteroid

Arts and entertainment
 "Mimi" (song), a popular song by Rodgers and Hart
 Mimi (1935 film), a 1935 British film
 Mimi (2021 Hindi film), a 2021 Indian comedy-drama film
 Mimi (2021 Nigerian film), a 2021 Nigerian film
 Un dramma borghese or Mimi, a 1979 Italian film
 Mimi (TV series), a 2014 South Korean television drama series
 MIMI (literary award)
 Mimi (magazine), a Japanese manga magazine
 "Mimi", a song by Big Red Machine featuring Ilsey from the 2021 album How Long Do You Think It's Gonna Last?

Other uses
 Mimi Chocolate, a Bangladeshi brand.
 Mimi (folklore), fairy-like being in the mythology of Northern Aboriginal Australians.
 Mimi language, several related languages spoken in Chad
 Mimi Temple, a temple in China
 HMS Mimi and HMS Toutou, two British boats brought to Lake Tanganyika to fight the Germans in 1915
 Mimi (horse), racehorse winner of the 1891 1000 Guineas and Oaks
 Magnetospheric Imaging Instrument, a sensing instrument used to study particles in Saturn's magnetic field

See also
 Mimivirus, the largest known virus affecting amoebae
 Mimi's Cafe, a restaurant chain in the United States